Anamarija Petričević (born 23 August 1972) is a retired Croatian swimmer.

Anamarija Petričević is a daughter of Đurđica Bjedov, gold and silver medalist in swimming at the 1968 Summer Olympics. Petričević competed for Yugoslavia at the 1988 Summer Olympics. She failed to advance past round one in 200 m breaststroke and 400 m individual medley, but made the B final in 200 m individual medley. In 1989 she won the 5 km gold medal at the European Open Water Swimming Championships held in Stari Grad.

Petričević retired from swimming in 1993. , she lives in Locarno, Switzerland, where she works as a swimming coach.

 Petričević holds the following senior national records (all set in 1988):
 50 meter pool
400 m freestyle (4:19.21)
400 m individual medley (4:46.33)
25 meter pool
400 individual medley (4:42.09)

Her long-standing national record in 200 m individual medley (2:16.38, 1988) was surpassed by Kim Daniela Pavlin in May 2012.

Sources
 Anamarija Petričević at Sports-Reference.com
 Meni su najviše dragi Goran, Toni i Dražen 
 Hrvatski savez daljinskog plivanja - Reprezentacija 
 Rekordi Hrvatske - Žene - 25m bazen
 Rekordi Hrvatske - Žene - 50m bazen 
 Kim Pavlin srušila rekord Anamarije Petričević iz 1988. 

1972 births
Croatian female swimmers
Female breaststroke swimmers
Croatian female freestyle swimmers
Croatian female medley swimmers
Swimmers at the 1988 Summer Olympics
Olympic swimmers of Yugoslavia
Sportspeople from Split, Croatia
Croatian swimming coaches
Croatian expatriate sportspeople in Switzerland
Living people
Female sports coaches
Yugoslav female swimmers
Female long-distance swimmers
People from Locarno